Little Caesar (February 18, 1928 – June 12, 1994) was an American singer and actor. He began his recording career in the 1950s, recording for labels such as Modern and Recorded In Hollywood. He had a hit on the R&B chart with "Goodbye Baby" in 1952. As an actor, Harry Caesar was best known for his roles in The Longest Yard (1974) and A Few Good Men (1992).

Biography
Little Caesar was born Harry Caesar to Alex Caesar and Hattie Chambers in Pittsburgh, Pennsylvania on February 18, 1928. He had several older siblings. When Caesar was one, his mother died from meningitis. In 1930, his father moved to Youngstown, Ohio, looking for work and left Caesar and his siblings with relatives. By 1940, Caesar and his brother Richard had joined their father in Youngstown. Caesar attended Rayen High School in Youngstown. During his teenage years he was rebellious and joined the Wolf Gang, going by the nickname "Kid Wolf". He ended up in jail and was drafted into the army in 1948. In the Army, he represented Fort Ord as a heavyweight boxer.

When Caesar was discharged in 1950, he intended to pursue a boxing career, but after a disappointing match which ended in a draw, he switched careers to R&B music. Caesar moved to the San Francisco area and worked with The Peter Rabbit Trio. He later relocated to Oakland, California and recorded for the Bihari Brothers at Modern Records and John Dolphin's Recorded In Hollywood. In July 1952, Caesar performed at the 3rd Annual Blues Jubilee held at the Shrine Auditorium and presented by KLAC DJ Gene Norman. His single, "Goodbye Baby", released on Recorded In Hollywood was very successful, reaching No. 5 on Billboard's Best Selling R&B chart in November 1952. In 1953, he released singles on Big Town Records and Modern's subsidiary RPM. In 1960, Caesar and his band the Ark Angels recorded for Jack Bee Records which soon became Downey Records.

Caesar turned to acting in 1960, and until 1993, he appeared in numerous films and television shows. He appeared on the shows Julia, Sanford and Son, Good Times, The Dukes of Hazzard, and L.A. Law. Caesar appeared in films such as The Longest Yard (1974), Murder in Mississippi (1990), and A Few Good Men (1992). In between acting jobs, Caesar continued to perform. He appeared with Joe Liggins in the 1980s. In 1992, Casesar performed at the Desert Dixieland Jazz 7 at the Riviera Resort Hotel in Palm Springs, California.

Caesar was married to Marion Kane Bernot, they had three daughters: Jacqueline, Valerie, and Kimberly. He died on June 12, 1994, in Los Angeles. He is buried at Inglewood Park Cemetery.

Discography

Albums 

 1983: Lying Woman... Goodbye Baby (Route 66)
2008: Your On The Hour Man: The Complete Modern, Dolphin And Downey Recordings 1952-1960 (Ace Records)

Singles 
 1952: "Don't Mention The Blues" / "Talkin' To Myself" (Recorded In Hollywood 233)	
 1952: "(Going Down To) The River" / "Long Time Baby" (Recorded In Hollywood 234)
 1952: "Goodbye Baby" / "If I Could See My Baby" (Recorded In Hollywood 235) – peaked at No. 5 on R&B chart
 1952: "Lying Woman" / "Move Me" (Recorded In Hollywood 236)
 1953: "Here Is A Letter" / "You're Part of Me" [B-side by Red Callender Sextette] (Recorded In Hollywood 237)
 1953: "Your Money Ain't Long Enough" / "Do Right Blues" (Recorded In Hollywood 238)
 1953: "You Can't Bring Me Down" / "Atomic Love" (Recorded In Hollywood 239)
 1953: "Big Eyes" / "Can't Stand It All Alone" (Big Town 106)
 1953: "Chains of Love Have Disappeared" / "Tried To Reason With You Baby" (RPM 393)
 1960: "I Hope That It's Me" / "What Are They Laughing About" (Jack Bee 1005)
 1960: "The Ghost of Mary Meade" / "The Ghost of Mary Meade (Instrumental)" (Jack Bee 1008)
 1964: "Show Me The Time" / "What Are They Laughing About" (Ride M-140)

Filmography

Film

Television

References

External links 

 
 Little Caesar on Unca Marvy

1928 births
1994 deaths
United States Army soldiers
Male actors from Pittsburgh
Musicians from Pittsburgh
Male actors from Youngstown, Ohio
Musicians from Youngstown, Ohio
African-American male actors
Recorded In Hollywood artists
Modern Records artists
RPM Records (United States) artists
Downey Records artists
20th-century African-American male singers